Donaspastus bosellii is a moth of the family Autostichidae. It is found on Sardinia.

References

External links
Lepiforum de

Moths described in 1941
Donaspastus
Moths of Europe